A Tribute to Mario Lanza is the seventh studio album by Australian tenor, Mark Vincent. The album was released through Sony Music Australia on 14 April 2017.

Track listing 
CD/DVD
 "Because You're Mine" (with Mario Lanza) – 3:25
 "Come Prima" – 3:39
 "Nessun Dorma" – 3:30
 "Be My Love" – 2:49
 "The Donkey Serenade" – 3:05
 "The Loveliest Night of the Year" – 3:10
 "E lucevan le stelle" – 2:49
 "’O sole mio" – 2:52
 "Arrivederci Roma" – 3:59
 "Mamma Mia, Che Vo' Sape?" – 2:23
 "Without a Song" – 3:41
 "I'll Walk with God" – 2:37

Charts

Weekly charts

Year-end charts

Release history

References 

2017 albums
Tribute albums
Mark Vincent albums
Sony Music Australia albums